Before & After is an album containing a collection of the greatest hits by Puerto Rican reggaeton duo, Magnate & Valentino.

Track listing
 "Anda" [Versión 2006]
 "Gata Celosa" (feat. Héctor y Tito)
 "Ya Lo Sé"
 "Vuelve a Mí"
 "Métele Dembow" (feat. Mario Vi)
 "Te Buscaré" (Magnate only)
 "Quiero Sentir Tu Cuerpo"
 "Dile A Ella" (feat. Don Omar)
 "Prohibido" (Valentino only)
 "Mujer Traicionada" (Magnate only)
 "Fuera De Control" (New track) (Magnate only)
 "Persígueme" (New track) (Valentino only)
 "Reggaetón" (New track)

Magnate & Valentino albums
2006 albums
Machete Music albums